The University of Cambridge Sports Centre is the University of Cambridge's main sporting facility.

History
The University of Cambridge Sports Centre opened in West Cambridge in August 2013. The Physical Education Department moved its offices from Fenner's in Gresham Road to the new Centre. It was considered by many to be a long-overdue addition to the University.

Facilities
The Sports Centre has a 37m x 34m Sports Hall with line markings for basketball, korfball, volleyball, five-a-side football, badminton, and netball. It also has tiered seating for up to 400 spectators.

The Fitness, Strength and Conditioning Suite is made up of a Fitness Suite, containing cardiovascular machines such as treadmills, ski ergs, and Jacobs Ladders, and a Strength and Conditioning Room, with eight Olympic lifting platforms and a two-lane plyometric track.

There is a multi-purpose room for floor-based sports and classes such as fencing, martial arts, yoga, and Zumba, and there are Eton and Rugby fives courts.

There are also five glass-backed squash courts and a team-training area used by many university sports clubs.

Future developments

Future phases of development at the Sports Centre are being discussed and may include indoor and outdoor tennis courts and a swimming pool.

On 2 April 2019 the University announced that it is currently taking steps to expand its West Cambridge site, which will include a swimming pool and indoor tennis courts. The new sports facilities will a stone's throw away from the new Eddington development, which has been constructed on the North West Cambridge site, near Huntingdon Road.

The plans are still in the early stages of development. The next phase of the project will be drawing up sketches of what the building itself could look like before public consultation.

References

Buildings and structures of the University of Cambridge
Sport at the University of Cambridge
Sports venues in Cambridge